Quintus Aurelius Memmius Symmachus (died 526) was a 6th-century Roman aristocrat, an historian and a supporter of Nicene Christianity.  He was a patron of secular learning, and became the consul for the year 485. He supported Pope Symmachus in the schism over the Popes' election, and was executed with his son-in-law Boethius after being charged with treason.

Biography 
He belonged to the Symmachi, one of the richest and most influential senatorial families in Rome; his father, Quintus Aurelius Symmachus, had been consul in 446. Memmius Symmachus had three daughters (Rusticiana, Galla and Proba) and adopted the young Anicius Manlius Severinus Boethius when his father died; later Boethius married Rusticiana, and the couple had two sons, Symmachus and Boethius, both consuls in 522. Memmius Symmachus' civil offices included being appointed sole consul for 485, the third known member of his family to hold this office.

Although Symmachus was the head of a family with a long connection with Pagan tradition—his grandfather Quintus Aurelius Symmachus delivered a famous speech urging the return of the Altar of Victory to the Roman Senate House—he was an ardent Christian, interested both in theological disputes and, more prosaically, in the struggles for the control of the Pope. During and after the disputed election of Pope Symmachus (who was apparently not related to him), he and Anicius Probus Faustus Niger were the only two senators known to support the pope against his more popular rival, Laurentius.

Symmachus cultivated the ancient Roman culture, writing a Roman history in seven volumes; this work has been lost except for a section quoted by Jordanes in his Getica. Symmachus' wealth enabled his patronage: he was involved in publication of the Commentarii in Somnium Scipionis by Macrobius Ambrosius Theodosius, and there is even a copy of the work corrected by his hand.

For the most part, Symmachus maintained good relationships with the new rulers of Italy—both Odovacer and Theodoric the Great -- demonstrated by his appointment as  praefectus urbi between 476 and 491, consul in 485, patricius within 510, and even reaching the influential rank of caput senatus (president of the Senate). His visit to Constantinople, after which Priscian dedicated him some poems, was likely on behalf of king Theodoric. However, Symmachus contradicted the Ostrogothic king, who condemned him to death for treason in 526, one year after the execution of Boethius.

Notes

Further reading 
 Martindale, John R., and John Morris, "Symmachus (9)", Prosopography of the Later Roman Empire, vol. 2, Cambridge 1980, pp. 1044–1046.
 Polara, Giovanni, Memmio Simmaco e il teatro, in Farmhouse Alberto Paulo and Paniagua David (eds.), Ways of Approaching Knowledge in Late Antiquity and the Early Middle Ages. Schools and Scholarship, Nordhausen, 2012 (Studia Classica et Mediaevalia, 8), pp. 158–176.

526 deaths
5th-century Italo-Roman people
5th-century Roman consuls
Imperial Roman consuls
5th-century Christians
6th-century Christians
6th-century Italo-Roman people
6th-century historians
Urban prefects of Rome
Year of birth unknown
Quintus Memmius
Symmachus, Quintus Aurelius
Patricii
Executed ancient Roman people
6th-century Italian writers
6th-century Latin writers